The taxon Ceramium siliquosum is a small marine alga.
It belongs to the red algae genus Ceramium.

Description
This small red alga grows to no more than 18 cm high. It is basically monosiphonous with distinct main branches which are cylindrical and corticated at the nodes. These incompletely corticate internodes appear collar-like around the branches. The tips of the branches are curled inwards and do not bear spines.

Reproduction
The gametophytes are dioecious. Spermatangia occur in sori which cover the cortical bands. Cystocarps containing carposporangia and terasporangia occur in whorls at the nodes.

Habitat
Found growing as an epiphyte on other algae in rock pools of the lower littoral to 12m depth.

Distribution
Recorded from Ireland from County Donegal. and Great Britain. In Europe from France and Spain.

References

siliquosum